The elm cultivar Ulmus × hollandica 'Haarlemensis', said to have been grown from seed c.1880 from a hybrid parent tree, was first listed by Springer as U. campestris haarlemensis in 1912.

Description
A slow-growing tree, forming an unbroken, broad pyramidal crown, with small, glossy, dark-green leaves persisting for several weeks longer than most in autumn.

Cultivation
Saplings grown from seed by Haarlem head forester J. Kollerie were first planted along a new canal in the city in 1891. An U. campestris 'Haarlemensis' was cultivated in the Poort Bulten Arboretum in the 20th century (see External Links). No specimens are known to survive.

References

External links

 

Dutch elm cultivar
Ulmus articles with images
Ulmus
Missing elm cultivars